The Best of the Alan Parsons Project, Vol. 2 is a 1988 greatest hits compilation by The Alan Parsons Project.

Track listing

References

The Alan Parsons Project albums
Albums produced by Alan Parsons
1988 greatest hits albums
Arista Records compilation albums